Metarctia hypomela is a moth of the subfamily Arctiinae. It was described by Sergius G. Kiriakoff in 1956. It is found in Kenya.

References

 

Endemic moths of Kenya
Metarctia
Moths described in 1956